Live in Mexico City is a live album by band King Crimson, first released as a free Windows Media Audio download in 1999. Some tracks later appeared on the live albums Cirkus: The Young Persons' Guide to King Crimson Live (1999) and Vrooom Vrooom (2001), and as part of the expanded "THRAK BOX" in 2015.
Recorded at the Metropolitan Theater, Mexico City, Mexico, 2–4 August 1996

Track listing
"Dinosaur" (Adrian Belew, Bill Bruford Robert Fripp, Trey Gunn, Tony Levin, Pat Mastelotto)
"One Time" (Belew, Bruford, Fripp, Gunn, Levin, Mastelotto)
"VROOOM VROOOM" (Belew, Bruford, Fripp, Gunn, Levin, Mastelotto)
"B’Boom" (Belew, Bruford, Fripp, Gunn, Levin, Mastelotto)
"THRAK" (Belew, Bruford, Fripp, Gunn, Levin, Mastelotto)
"Sex Sleep Eat Drink Dream" (Belew, Bruford, Fripp, Gunn, Levin, Mastelotto)
"The Talking Drum" (Bruford, David Cross, Fripp, Jamie Muir, John Wetton)
"Larks’ Tongues in Aspic (Part II)" (Fripp)
"Neurotica" (Belew, Bruford, Fripp, Levin)
"21st Century Schizoid Man" (Fripp, Michael Giles, Greg Lake, Ian McDonald, Peter Sinfield)
"Prism" (Pierre Favre)
"Red" (Fripp)

Personnel
Robert Fripp – guitar
Adrian Belew – guitar, vocals
Tony Levin – bass guitar, Chapman stick, backing vocals
Trey Gunn – Warr guitar
Bill Bruford – drums, percussion
Pat Mastelotto – drums, percussion
 Ronan Chris Murphy – mixing

1999 live albums
King Crimson live albums
Discipline Global Mobile albums